Parliamentary elections were held in Benin on 30 March 1999. The Benin Rebirth Party retained its status as the largest party in the National Assembly, increasing its number of seats from 21 to 27, whilst the Democratic Renewal Party won only 11 seats, a reduction of seven.

Results

References

Elections in Benin
Benin
1999 in Benin
National Assembly (Benin)